

List of Ambassadors
Yoram Elron 2012 - 2015, 2000 - 2003 
Yerachmiel Ram Yaron 1960 - 1964

References

Congo
Israel